Aceturic acid (N-acetylglycine) is a derivative of the amino acid glycine. The conjugate base of this carboxylic acid is called aceturate, a term used for its esters and salts.

Preparation
Aceturic acid can be prepared by warming glycine either with a slight excess of acetic anhydride in benzene, or with an equal molar amount of acetic anhydride in glacial (concentrated) acetic acid.

See also
 Aceglutamide
 N-Acetylglutamic acid
 Aceburic acid

References

Acetamides